Luannan County is a county in the east of Hebei province, China. It is under the administration of the Tangshan city.

Administrative Divisions
Towns:
Bencheng, Songdaokou, Changning, Luannan County, Hugezhuang, Tuoli, Yaowangzhuang, Sigezhuang, Angezhuang, Bachigang, Chengzhuang, Qingtuoying, Baigezhuang, Liuzan, Nanbao, Fanggezhuang, Donghuangtuo, Macheng

Climate

References

External links

County-level divisions of Hebei
Tangshan